The following is a list of mascots of J. League (Japan Professional Football League) teams:

References 

mascots
Japan
Lists of mascots